Main Task (German: Hauptaufgabe) was the economic policy proclaimed in the German Democratic Republic during the Eight SED Congress in June 1971, and aimed at increased production of consumer goods for the population and to increase its material well-being in order to provide a higher standard of living for the population. The policy's official goal was "raising the people’s material and cultural standard of living on the basis of a fast developmental pace of socialist production, of higher efficiency, of scientific-technological progress and the growth of the productivity of labour". Or in the official formulation - to achieve "unity of economic and social policy". Between 1971 and 1982 the GDP of the GDR grew at average 5% annually, however the pursued policy only increased the state's debts and by 1982, GDR was nearly insolvent. This change of policy was greatly influenced by the 1970 Polish protests which led to greater emphasis on consumer goods and welfare policies in the entire Eastern Bloc.

In reaction to Walter Ulbricht’s many policy changes, Erich Honecker imposed a more traditionalist Weimar-era communist ideology which influenced his economic policies as well. Instead of Ulbricht’s technocrats who dreamt about overtaking capitalist West, he promoted ideologues who ended experiments and pursued more short-term goals of increased welfare. Wages, pensions and welfare programs were increased thus providing population with more money to spend on consumer goods. The following few years were some of the most prosperous in the history of the GDR. Emphasis on welfare programs for women was one of the ways to further increased participation of women in the workforce. In 1970, 82% of working age women were employed, in 1980 this rose to 87%, and in 1989 to 91%.

As the working-age population was already almost fully employed, to increase productivity the "Scientific Organisation of Labour" policy was introduced in 1973. Three-shift system and elements of Taylorism were introduced to maximize the work intensity. 

Much capital and energy was spent on building new housing districts and restoration of the neglected pre-war housing stock in order to provide all families with decent housing. While the prefabricated housing districts lacked individuality, they provided the basic living needs at a very low cost, as the state was subsidizing much of the rent and utilities costs. Many of Honecker's policies reflected the ideals of his communist youth. Cheap housing, utilities and basic foodstuffs meant more to him than cars and modern consumer goods that the GDR population increasingly desired, especially when comparing its living standards with those of Western Germany.

The official GDR statistics claimed that in 1970, for every 100 households there were 15 cars, 53 washing machines, 56 refrigerators and 69 TVs. In 1981 this had risen to 37 cars, 82 washing machines, 99 refrigerators and 90 TVs.

Debt crisis
As the GDR was unable to rapidly increase its welfare and to increase its exports simultaneously, a growing budget deficit created problems by 1972. Despite SED propaganda, there were no increases in the socialistic productivity. By the mid-70s, instead of instituting any new reforms, Honecker decided to fund his policies by increased borrowing from the West, and especially from Western Germany. By 1985 GDR's debt to Western countries had grown to 25.1 billion Valutamarks. The debt servicing rate for the foreign currency debt reached 168%.

Hoping to increase its export income, in 1977 GDR returned to the ideas of Ulbricht, and began to develop semiconductor and microprocessor industry which, despite large investments, failed to achieve the desired results and GDR export income continued to decrease.

GDR was unable to increase its exports to West as it lacked exportable products of sufficient quality, at the same time it relied on the cheap basic material supplies from the Soviet Union, which demanded payment in GDR-produced goods, which were of higher quality than those produced in the USSR.

References

Economy of East Germany
Economic history of Germany